Csongrád is a town in southern Hungary.

Csongrád may also refer to:

Csongrád County county in southern Hungary
Csongrád County (former) former county in Hungary